Asli Hassan Abade was the first African woman Air Force pilot in whole of Africa and middle east. She is a Somali Air force pilot, military figure, and civil activist. She was the first and so far the only female pilot in the Somali Air Force (SAF).  As of October 2009, she was living in the U.S. state of Texas. Asli was popular in the Somali air force, where she was a pilot from 1976 until the end of 1992 when civil war finally crippled Somalia.

Career

Somali Air Force
Abade solo-piloted her first flight on 9 September 1976.

Peace campaign
In the mid-2000s, Abade waged a peace campaign, encouraging lawmakers to come together and put an end to the long-standing civil conflict in her native Somalia. Attending every major political function dressed in the colors of the Somali flag, she reportedly commanded the respect of all the attendees. For her efforts in the reconciliation process that took place in neighboring Arta, Djibouti, which saw the establishment of the Transitional Federal Government, she was accorded the nickname Calansida ("The Flag-bearer").

Abade describes herself as a "patriot", and as "a strong lady", on account of her military experience.

See also
Ali Matan Hashi

References

Ethnic Somali people
Somalian women aviators
Living people
Somalian expatriates in the United States
Somalian military personnel
Year of birth missing (living people)
People from Jijiga